The 2013 Bryant Bulldogs football team represented Bryant University in the 2013 NCAA Division I FCS football season. They were led by tenth year head coach Marty Fine and played their home games at Bulldog Stadium. They were a member of the Northeast Conference. They finished the season 5–7, 3–3 in NEC play to finish in a three way tie for third place.

Schedule

Source: Schedule

References

Bryant
Bryant Bulldogs football seasons
Bryant Bulldogs football